Live at Legends is a 2012 album by Buddy Guy. It peaked at #2 on the Billboard Blues chart and #70 on the Billboard Tastemakers chart. The album is a live recording of Buddy Guy at Buddy Guy's Legends, recorded on January 29 & 30, 2010. The album was also nominated for Best New Recording by Living Blues. The album is some of his last recordings at the old Buddy Guy's Legends location and includes three previously unreleased tracks at the end of the album. Guitar World also named it one of the Top 25 Live, Reissued and Archival Albums of 2012.

Charts

Musicians

Tracks 1-8 (Recorded Live at Legends)
 Buddy Guy - lead guitar, vocals
 Ric 'Jaz' Hall - Guitar
 Marty Sammon - Keyboards, background vocals
 Orlando Wright - Bass
 Tim Austin - Drums
 Tom Hambridge - Background Vocals, Tambourine

Bonus Studio Tracks
 Buddy Guy - lead guitar, vocals
 Tom Hambridge - Drums, Percussion
 David Grissom - Guitar
 Reese Wynans - Keyboards, B-3
 Marty Sammon - Piano, Wurlitzer
 Michael Rhodes - Bass 
 Tommy Macdonald - Bass
 The Memphis Horns
 Jack Hale - Trombone
 Wayne Jackson - Trumpet
 Tom McGinley - Tenor Saxophone

Personnel
 Tom Hambridge - Producer, Mixing
 Michael Saint-Leon - Mixing
 Michael Maxson - Sound Engineer

Track listing

References 

2012 live albums
Buddy Guy albums
RCA Records live albums